The Lord Cohen Medal is a British medical award honouring individuals who "have made a considerable contribution to ageing research, either through original discoveries or in the promotion of the subject of gerontology in its broadest aspect". It is the highest award for services to gerontology in the United Kingdom and is named after British physician Henry Cohen.

The medal is awarded by the British Society for Research on Ageing on a sporadic basis.

Recipients
2017 , Newcastle University  
2016 , University of Brighton 
2015 Richard Aspinall, Coventry University
2014 , University of Liverpool
2013 Janet Mary Lord, University of Birmingham
2011 Suresh I. S. Rattan, Aarhus University, Denmark
2008 Arlan G. Richardson, Barshop Institute, University of Texas
2007 Raymond Tallis, University of Manchester
2006 Tom Kirkwood, Newcastle University
2004 Linda Partridge, University College, London
1999 Leonard Hayflick, University of California, San Francisco
1987 Robin Holliday, National Institute of Medical Research
1984 Arthur Norman Exton-Smith, University College Hospital, London
1980 , Leeds University

See also

 List of medicine awards

References 
External links
British Society for Research on Ageing - Lord Cohen Medal

Medicine awards
British awards
Awards established in 1980